Birdhouse Skateboards (originally Birdhouse Projects) is a skateboard company formed by ex-Powell Peralta professional skateboarders Tony Hawk and Per Welinder in 1992.

Birdhouse makes decks and wheels, as well as clothing and accessories.

History
After the skateboard boom of the late 1980s had died, former Powell Peralta professional and freestyle skateboarder Per Welinder wanted to stay involved with skateboarding by starting a company. Welinder had originally asked Powell Peralta pro skateboarder Lance Mountain to be his equal partner in the venture. Mountain declined as he only wanted to start a skateboard company if he had 100% ownership. Mountain later founded The Firm Skateboards (now defunct). Welinder later asked another Powell Peralta pro skateboarder Tony Hawk to be 50-50 partners in this new skateboard company. Hawk gladly accepted as he felt his time in skateboarding was nearly over due to the lack of interest in vert skating caused by the popularity of street skating. Welinder and Hawk decided to name their new skateboard company Birdhouse Projects, Birdhouse being a reference to Hawk's nickname Birdman.

Birdhouse is prominently featured in the Tony Hawk's video game series, and is one of five skate teams which the player can join in Tony Hawk's Underground.

Skate team
Tony Hawk
Aaron Homoki
Ben Raybourn
Clint Walker
David Loy
Lizzie Armanto
Clive Dixon
Shawn Hale
Elliot Sloan
Reese Salken
Felipe Nunes
Reese Nelson

Former
Jeremy Klein
Willy Santos
Steve Berra
Matt Beach
Andrew Reynolds
Heath Kirchart
Rick McCrank
Brian Sumner
Jeff Lenoce
Steve Nesser
Shaun White
Riley Hawk
Bucky Lasek
Mike Frazier
Paul Zitzer
Ocean Howell

References

External links 

Skateboarding companies
Privately held companies based in California